Western Mining can refer to:

 Western Mining Co., Ltd., a Chinese mining company.
 Western Mining Corporation, a now defunct Australian mining company.
 Western Mining and Railroad Museum, a mining museum in Utah.